= Manakawad =

- Village
- Country: India
- State: Karnataka
- District: Dharwad

Government
  - Type: Panchayat raj
  - Body: Gram panchayat

Population (2011)
  - Total: 2,191

Languages
  - Official: Kannada
- Time zone: UTC+5:30 (IST)
- ISO 3166 code: IN-KA
- Vehicle registration: KA
- Website: karnataka.gov.in

Manakawad is a village in Dharwad district of Karnataka, India.

== Demographics ==
As of the 2011 Census of India there were 457 households in Manakawad and a total population of 2,191 consisting of 1,107 males and 1,084 females. There were 233 children ages 0-6. Manakawad is a large village located in Navalgund Taluka of Dharwad district, Karnataka with total 457 families residing. The Manakawad village has population of 2191 of which 1107 are males while 1084 are females as per Population Census 2011.

In Manakawad village population of children with age 0-6 is 233 which makes up 10.63 % of total population of village. Average Sex Ratio of Manakawad village is 979 which is higher than Karnataka state average of 973. Child Sex Ratio for the Manakawad as per census is 849, lower than Karnataka average of 948.

Manakawad village has lower literacy rate compared to Karnataka. In 2011, literacy rate of Manakawad village was 72.83 % compared to 75.36 % of Karnataka. In Manakawad Male literacy stands at 84.81 % while female literacy rate was 60.80 %.

As per constitution of India and Panchyati Raaj Act, Manakawad village is administrated by Sarpanch (Head of Village) who is elected representative of village. Manakawad Data Particulars Total Male Female Total No. of Houses 457 - - Population 2,191 1,107 1,084 Child (0-6) 233 126 107 Schedule Caste 143 65 78 Schedule Tribe 40 18 22 Literacy 72.83 % 84.81 % 60.80 % Total Workers 1,301 684 617 Main Worker 1,269 - - Marginal Worker 32 16 16

Caste Factor Schedule Caste (SC) constitutes 6.53 % while Schedule Tribe (ST) were 1.83 % of total population in Manakawad village. n Manakawad village out of total population, 1301 were engaged in work activities. 97.54 % of workers describe their work as Main Work (Employment or Earning more than 6 Months) while 2.46 % were involved in Marginal activity providing livelihood for less than 6 months. Of 1301 workers engaged in Main Work, 768 were cultivators (owner or co-owner) while 401 were Agricultural labourer.

https://www.landrecords.karnataka.gov.in/service3/FileDownload.aspx?file=%5c%5cbhm-db-pp05%5cDistrict%5cMapshared%5c6011.pdf
